Radovan Jančić is a politician in Serbia. He has served in the National Assembly of Serbia since 2016 as a member of the Serbian Progressive Party.

Early life and career
Jančić was born in Srpski Krstur in Vojvodina, then part of the People's Republic of Serbia in the Federal People's Republic of Yugoslavia. He is a civil engineering technician in private life.

Member of the National Assembly
Jančić sought election to the Assembly of Vojvodina in the 2008 provincial election as a candidate of the Serbian Radical Party in the Novi Kneževac division. He was defeated in the second round of voting by Jovanka Petrović, a candidate endorsed by the Democratic Party. The Radical Party split later in 2008, and Jančić joined the breakaway Progressive Party.

Jančić received the seventy-sixth position on the Progressive Party's Aleksandar Vučić – Serbia Is Winning electoral list in the 2016 Serbian parliamentary election and was elected to the assembly when the list won a landslide victory with 131 out of 250 mandates. He is currently of member of the parliamentary committee on agriculture, forestry, and water management; a deputy member of two other committees; and a member of the parliamentary friendship groups for Austria, Belarus, France, Georgia, Israel, Kazakhstan, Russia, and Switzerland. He is also active in municipal politics in Novi Kneževac and was re-elected to the municipal assembly in the 2016 Serbian local elections.

Electoral record

Provincial (Vojvodina)

References

1958 births
Living people
Members of the National Assembly (Serbia)
People from Srpski Krstur
Serbian Radical Party politicians
Serbian Progressive Party politicians